Suvash Gurung (born 7 September 1991) also known as Subash Gurung, is a Nepalese professional footballer who plays as a midfielder for Martyr's Memorial A-Division League club Sankata Boys S.C. and the Nepal national team. He made his international debut against Kuwait on 19 November 2019 in FIFA World Cup qualification match held in Thimphu.

References

1991 births
Living people
Nepalese footballers
Nepal international footballers
Association football midfielders